The Main Chance  is a British television series first aired on ITV in four series between 1969 and 1975. It is a drama series that depicts the sudden transformation in the life of a solicitor, David Main (played by John Stride), after he moves from London to Leeds. It was created by Edmund Ward and John Malcolm; the latter was a pseudonym for John Batt who was a practising solicitor. Batt also composed the theme music.

Episodes

In all, 45 episodes were aired, each around 45 to 50 minutes long and divided into three parts. The first series, shown in 1969, was in black and white. From then on the show went out in colour. The first series consisted of six episodes, while subsequent series contained thirteen episodes each. The three later series were transmitted in 1970, 1972 and 1975.

Cast
 John Stride – David Main 
 Kate O'Mara – Julia Main  (Series 1)
 Margaret Ashcroft – Margaret Castleton
 John Wentworth  – Henry Castleton 
 Anna Palk – Sarah Courtney (later Lady Radchester) (Series 1–3)
 Philip Bond – Peter Findon  (Series 1–2,4)
 John Arnatt – Sidney Bulmer  (Series 1–2)
 Gareth Forwood – Julian Webb (Series 2)
 Glynn Edwards  – Walter Clegg  (Series 3–4)
 Estelle Kohler – Hilary Nash  (Series 3)
 Sharon Maughan – Inge Lindstrom  (Series 4)
 Ingrid Hafner – Laura Granton  (Series 4)
 Gary Bond – Andrew Retford  (Series 4)

Home video
All four series have been released on DVD in the UK.

References

External links

1969 British television series debuts
1975 British television series endings
1960s British drama television series
1970s British drama television series
1960s British legal television series
1970s British legal television series
ITV television dramas
Television series by ITV Studios
Television series by Yorkshire Television
Television shows set in Leeds
English-language television shows